Nizhny Torey (Doodo Tori) is a rural locality (a selo) in Dzhidinsky District, Republic of Buryatia, Russia. The population was 1,251 as of 2010. There are 20 streets.

Geography 
Nizhny Torey is located 37 km southwest of Petropavlovka (the district's administrative centre) by road. Oyor is the nearest rural locality.

References 

Rural localities in Dzhidinsky District